Elaine L. Bearer is an American neuroscientist, pathologist, and composer.

Education 
Bearer received her Bachelor's of Music from The Manhattan School of Music in Theory, June 1970. She received the Masters of Art from New York University, where her thesis was Structural Innovation in the String Quartets of Haydn. Prior to studies at The Manhattan School, Bearer was a pupil of Nadia Boulanger, first at the Ecole Americaine des Beaux Arts in Fontainebleau and continuing in Boulanger's home on Rue Ballu in Paris. She received the combined MD-PhD degree from University of California San Francisco (UCSF).

Career 
After a one-year post-doctoral fellowship with Lelio Orci in Geneva, Bearer returned to UCSF for residency and fellowship training—clinically in Pathology and Medical Genetics with Charlie Epstein, and scientifically in Biochemistry and Biophysics with Bruce Alberts. She was recruited to a tenure track position at Brown University in 1991 and rose in the ranks to full professorship. In 2009 University of New Mexico recruited her to an endowed tenured professorship and as Vice Chair for Research.

Scientific contributions
Bearer studied neurophysiology in John G. Nicholl's lab at Stanford University. Bearer's early scientific contributions as a graduate student include the first ultrastructural imaging of lipid rafts in cell membranes that mediate neuronal signaling (Bearer and Friend, J. Cell Biol., 1982); then as a post-doc the first ultrastructural imaging of endothelial fenestral diaphragms that allow transport of solutes between blood and tissue (Bearer and Orci, J. Cell Biol., 1985), and the first biochemical discovery of Arp2 and 2E4/kaptin, proteins that regulate actin dynamics in neurons (Bearer, 1992) and platelets. While a Principal Investigator in her own lab at Brown University, Bearer discovered that these proteins, initially identified while Bearer was a post-doc at UCSF, turned out to be major regulatory components of the  length of stereocilia in the hearing apparatus of the inner ear.

Bearer turned to brain-wide imaging by magnetic resonance imaging in living animals over time during a sabbatical from Brown to Caltech in 2004-2005. This new venture reulsted in multiple contributions since 2007 include imaging of the brain in living mouse models of human neuropsychological disorders, such as Down syndrome, Alzheimer's disease, fear to anxiety transitions, viral infections of the brain, and drugs of abuse. Together with collaborator Russell E. Jacobs, Bearer developed and deployed longitudinal manganese-enhanced magnetic resonance imaging (MEMRI) coupled with behavior, transgenic mouse models, biochemistry, and optical microscopy to explore brain-wide responses to experience and disease over time.

Since 2009, Bearer has been the Harvey Family Professor in Pathology at University of New Mexico, a visitor at California Institute of Technology, and an Elected Fellow of the American Association for the Advancement of Science. Bearer is also a fellow of the College of American Pathologists.

In 2019 The Manhattan School awarded Bearer the Distinguished Alumni Award, and in 2020, she received a Campaign Alumni Award for "most audacious"  from University of California, San Francisco. In 2021 she has been bestowed with an honorary professorship from The Strømstadt Akademi, in Sweden,  a Nordic Academy for Advance Studies. Her newly composed string quartet premiered at the award ceremony.

Research details 
Bearer's research began with studies of membrane dynamics involved in synaptic transmitter release. She developed imaging labels for anionic lipids and made the earliest observations of membrane lipid rafts. and the protein biochemistry of actin modulators During this investigation, she identified proteins that drive filament formation and mapped one, kaptin/2E4, on human chromosome 19. This work revealed that mutations in the promoter region of kaptin/2E4 lead to inherited deafness.

Using herpes simplex virus (HSV) as a tool and the squid giant axon as a model, her lab then discovered that amyloid precursor protein (AAP), whose proteolytic product Abeta is the major component of Alzheimer's plaques, recruited cytoskeletal motors to cargo for intracellualr transport within axons. Live video recording of green-labeled HSV and red-labeled APP and high resolution immunogold electronmicroscopy demonstrated that intracellular HSV viral particles interact with cellular APP. Her work on HSV has led towards understanding the HSV-APP connections and its role in Alzheimer's disease.

In 2004, Bearer began developing magnetic resonance imaging with Russell E. Jacobs, John D. Roberts, and Scott E. Fraser for live imaging of circuitry in mouse models of human neurological and psychiatric disorders. Bearer and Jacobs developed manganese-enhanced magnetic resonance imaging (MEMRI) of neural connections and brain activity in transgenic mouse models of human disorders. From 2006 until 2021, Bearer and Jacobs co-authored 15 publications using MEMRI to discover alterations in hippocampal and forebrain projections.

Music
Bearer is a composer, who has had performances annually of new compositions. While at Brown University from 1991–2009, she was a professor in both Biology and Medicine and in Music, and sheholds a secondary appointment in the Music Department at University of New Mexico. Her piano concerto, Ode to the White Crown Sparrow, was premiered by Tyler Lincoln and the Symphony of the Redwoods; Ah-tosh-mit Overture for orchestra was commissioned for the 125th anniversary of University of California, San Francisco (UCSF), and performed by the UCSF Symphony under the baton of Jonathan Davis; the Magdalene Passion, an hour-long oratorio for five soloists, chorus, organ and chamber orchestra, was commissioned by the Providence Singers and premiered by Julian Wachner, conductor; Ultrasonic, a symphonic tone poem, was commissioned and performed by St Mathew's Music Guild in Pacific Palisades under the direction of Tom Neenan and multiple choral works with various instrumental accompaniments have been performed by the Pasadena Promusica led by Stephen Grimm. In March 2018, Pasadena Promusica premiered Bearer's  L'alma rapita for chorus and string quartet inspired by Carlo Gesualdo, the 16-17th century madrigalist.

Bearer's piece for solo flute with interactive video projections, Density silver water,  was performed as part of the John Donald Robb Composer's Showcase in New Mexico by Jesse Tatum with video projections by John B Carpenter in March 2018; and The Replication Machine, for viola-clarinet duo with readings and audience participation was presented to Bruce M. Alberts for his birthday at the Metropolitan Club in San Francisco in April 2018.

A CD of Bearer's music was issued by Albany Records.  The score of her Nicholls Trio, written as a tribute to John Graham Nicholls, is published by Hildegaard Publishing Company.

References

Fellows of the American Association for the Advancement of Science
American neuroscientists
University of California, San Francisco alumni
Year of birth missing (living people)
Living people
American women neuroscientists
American women academics
21st-century American composers
21st-century American women